Social refers to the interaction of people and other organisms with each other, and to their collective co-existence.

Social may also refer to:

Social science and economics

 Social ownership, ownership of the means of production by society as a whole;
 Social system, patterns of interrelationships between individuals, groups and institutions;
 Relating to Socialism, the society-wide ownership and coordination of production and resource allocation;

Politics and public policy

 Social policy, policies concerning the welfare of economically and socially-disadvantaged members of society;
 Social security
 Social housing
 Relating to the social welfare of a population;

Culture and media
 Social media, as in e.g. "What's our social strategy?"
 The Heavenly Social, also known as "The Social", a chain of venues owned by Heavenly Records
 The Social (Irish TV series), fronted by Craig Doyle
 The Social (Canadian TV series), a Canadian daytime television talk show
 a 2013 social cognitive neuroscience book, Social: Why Our Brains Are Wired to Connect by Matthew Lieberman
 The Social, a venue run by the Beacham Theatre in Orlando, Florida

Other uses
 A party or other social event

See also
 Social activity (disambiguation)
 
 

Social science disambiguation pages